42 Herculis is a single star located around 450 light years away from the Sun in the northern constellation of Hercules. It is visible to the naked eye as a faint, red-hued star with an apparent visual magnitude of 4.86. The star is moving closer to the Earth with a heliocentric radial velocity of −56 km/s.

This is an aging red giant star on the asymptotic giant branch with a stellar classification of M2.5III. It has been catalogued as a suspected variable star, although a 1992 photometric survey found the brightness to be constant. Having exhausted the supply of hydrogen at its core, the star has expanded to 64 times the Sun's radius. It is radiating 734 times the luminosity of the Sun from its swollen photosphere at an effective temperature of 3761 K.

There is an unknown source of X-ray and far ultraviolet emission originating from a location offset by more than one arcsecond from the star. This may indicate there is an undetected main sequence companion.

References

M-type giants
Asymptotic-giant-branch stars
Suspected variables
Hercules (constellation)
Durchmusterung objects
Herculis, 042
150450
081497
6200